Spono Eagles is a Swiss women's handball club from Nottwil founded in 1971. 
Reaching the Swiss Premium League in 1988, it has been a regular in EHF competitions since the 1990s, and it won three national championships between 2000 and 2006. Spono's best international results to date were reaching the Round of 16 of the EHF Cup and the Challenge Cup. In its three appearances in the Champions League it was defeated in the first qualifying round.
2015 they changed the name from Spono Nottwil to Spono Eagles.

Titles
 Swiss Premium League
 2000, 2001, 2006, 2018, 2022
 Swiss Cups
 2001, 2011, 2013, 2018, 2019

European record

Team

Current squad 
Squad for the 2022–23 season

Goalkeepers
 1  Soraya Schaller
 12  Marion Ort
 26  Aline Strebel
Wingers
RW
 4  Samira Schardt
 5  Carmen Jund
 8  Mia Emmenegger
LW 
 19  Sabrina Amrein
 22  Marina Decurtins
Line players 
 18  Livia Amrein
 20  Thilde Harbo Boesen

Back players
LB
 9  Alina Stähelin
 11  Mareike Müller
 23  Lisa Maria Schenk
CB 
 3  Ana Emmenegger
 10  Kira Zumstein
 27  Catherina Csebits
RB
 13  Xenia Hodel

References

External links
  
 Profile in EHF's website
 

Swiss handball clubs
Handball clubs established in 1971
1971 establishments in Switzerland
Canton of Lucerne